San Francisco de Tilcara (usually referred to as Tilcara) is a city in the province of Jujuy, Argentina, and the head town of the Tilcara Department. Traces of human habitation in the area date back more than 10,000 years, making it one of the oldest continuously inhabited settlements of Argentina.

Tilcara is located 84 km from the provincial capital, San Salvador de Jujuy, beside National Route 9, at about 2,500 m above sea level, well within the first heights of the Andes.

The area features dramatic mountainous landscapes and rich aboriginal traditions, which make it a major tourist attraction in northwestern Argentina, with several nearby hiking tracks also attracting visitors.

Possibly the biggest attraction in Tilcara is the nearby Pucará de Tilcara, the partially reconstructed ruins of a pre-Inca pukara, Quechua for "fortress", located a few kilometers away from the city of Tilcara on a hill with an impressive view of the valley of the Río Grande.

Climate

 Köppen classification: BWk (Cool Arid Climate)
 Thermal amplitude: 
 Maximum average temperature:  (January)
Average minimum temperature:  (July)
Average annual temperature: between 
Average annual rainfall:  (almost entirely between November and March)

References

 
 Civitas/PSI. Tilcara (portal).
 WelcomeArgentina. Tilcara, Argentina (general and touristic information).

Populated places in Jujuy Province
Cities in Argentina
Argentina
Jujuy Province